In the U.S. state of Montana, Interstate 15 (I-15, additionally named as the First Special Service Force Memorial Highway from Helena to the Alberta, Canada border, where it continues on into Canada retaining that designation) continues onward from Idaho for nearly  through the cities of Butte, Helena, and Great Falls, intersecting with I-90, I-115, and I-315. I-15 reaches its northern terminus at the international border with Alberta, Canada.

I-15 joins with I-90 and makes a junction with a short,  spur route I-115 in Butte.

Route description

I-15 crosses into Montana from Idaho just south of Lima Reservoir, before the route continues northwest through farmland and desert. The freeway turns north at Clark Canyon Reservoir, before turning northeast. In the town of Dillon, I-15 passes near Clark's Lookout State Park before beginning to parallel the Big Hole River. The freeway then turns away from the river, continuing northeast along Divide Creek through the desert, before splitting away from the creek and heading north. I-15 eventually merges into I-90 at a trumpet interchange.

I-15 and I-90 run concurrently through the city of Butte, coming first to an interchange with I-115, signed as Business Loop 15 and Business Loop 90. I-15 and I-90 pass through a green area in the middle of the city, before I-15 splits off to the northeast on the eastern end of the town. The freeway goes through the forest and plains north of I-90 before winding along Bison Creek and later the Boulder River. I-15 passes through the town of Basin before leaving the mountains and providing access to Boulder. Paralleling Beavertown Creek, the road winds through the hills before passing through Jefferson City. The freeway continues into Helena, where I-15 intersects US 12 and runs concurrently with US 287 through the outskirts of the city before continuing north through the plains.

I-15 and US 287 continue along Little Prickly Pear Creek before passing through the town of Wolf Creek after several miles. Northeast of there, US 287 continues north, while I-15 runs close to the Missouri River. The freeway provides access to Cascade and then continues through the plains through Ulm before turning northeast into the city of Great Falls. I-315 and US 89 intersect with I-15 at a trumpet interchange, and US 89 continues north and then northwest along I-15 for a few miles before continuing to the west. I-15 continues northwest through farmland before passing near Dutton and Brady, and the city of Conrad. US 2 intersects I-15 in the town of Shelby. The freeway passes through the town of Sunburst, then passes through a final stretch of farmland. Eventually, I-15 passes through the last town before Canada, Sweet Grass, and then crosses the international border, becoming Alberta Highway 4.

In 1996, I-15 between Helena and Sweet Grass was renamed the "First Special Service Force Memorial Highway". It was chosen because it was the route taken in 1942 by the Canadian volunteers to join their American counterparts for training at Fort Harrison.

Exit list

References

External links

15
 Montana
Transportation in Beaverhead County, Montana
Transportation in Madison County, Montana
Transportation in Silver Bow County, Montana
Transportation in Jefferson County, Montana
Transportation in Lewis and Clark County, Montana
Transportation in Cascade County, Montana
Transportation in Teton County, Montana
Transportation in Pondera County, Montana
Transportation in Toole County, Montana